Isabel de la Cruz, was a Spanish mystic.   

She was a co-founder of the Alumbrados movement. 

She was the subject of a long heresy trial by the Spanish Inquisition, lasting between 1524 and 1529.

References

16th-century Spanish people
16th-century Spanish women
People charged with heresy